Xuanwumen station is a station of Line 1 of the Nanjing Metro.

The station is named after Xuanwumen or Xuanwu Gate: the north gate of Ming Palace, Nanjing; Xuanwu itself refer to Black Tortoise, a deity for North.

Nearby places
Xuanwu Lake
Hunan Road Commercial Street and Lions' Bridge (Shiziqiao) Pedestrian Street

References 

Railway stations in Jiangsu
Nanjing Metro stations
Railway stations in China opened in 2005